Shadda Palace was the main ruling palace in Abha, Saudi Arabia. It was established around 1820. It has now been converted to a museum. It has a selection of traditional utensils, furniture and others.

See also

 List of museums in Saudi Arabia

References

Abha
Houses completed in 1820
Museums in Saudi Arabia
Palaces in Saudi Arabia
Royal residences in Saudi Arabia